Poojapushpam is a 1969 Indian Malayalam-language film, directed by Thikkurissy Sukumaran Nair and produced by K. S. Gopalakrishnan (Tamil). The film stars Prem Nazir, Sheela, Thikkurissy Sukumaran Nair and T. S. Muthaiah. The film's score was composed by V. Dakshinamoorthy.

Cast
Prem Nazir
Sheela
Thikkurissy Sukumaran Nair
T. S. Muthaiah
Aranmula Ponnamma
Bahadoor
Khadeeja
Meena
S. P. Pillai
Vijayasree

Soundtrack
The music was composed by V. Dakshinamoorthy with lyrics by Thikkurissy Sukumaran Nair.

References

External links
 

1969 films
1960s Malayalam-language films
Films directed by Thikkurissy Sukumaran Nair